Mihajlo is a South Slavic variant of the name Michael, often found among Serbs. Cognate names include Mihailo and Mijailo.

Science
Mihajlo Pupin (1858–1935), Serbian physicist
Mihajlo D. Mesarovic (born 1928), Serbian American scientist

Sports
Mihajlo Pjanović (born 1977), Serbian football player
Mihajlo Andrić (born 1994), Serbian basketball player
Mihajlo Ristovski (born 1983), Macedonian swimmer
Mihajlo Cakić (born 1990), Serbian footballer
Mihajlo Mitić (born 1990), Serbian volleyball player
Mihajlo Vujačić (born 1973), Montenegrin former football forward
Mihajlo Dimitrijević (1927–1995), Serbian high jumper
Mihajlo Arsoski (born 1995), Macedonian professional basketballer

Military
Mihajlo Apostolski (1906–1987), Yugoslav general, military theoretician, politician and historian
Mihajlo Lukić (1886–1961), Austro-Hungarian and Yugoslav general
Mihajlo–Mitchell Paige (1918–2003), American-Serbian army officer

Royalty and nobility
 Mihajlo Višević, ruler of Zahumlje
 Mihajlo Krešimir II (d. 969), king of Croatia
 Mihajlo I of Duklja (d. 1081), Prince of Serbs, ruler of Duklja
 Mihajlo II of Duklja, ruler of Duklja (c. 1101-1102)
 Mihajlo III of Duklja, ruler of Duklja (c. 1180-1189)
 Mihajlo Branivojević (d. 1326), Serbian nobleman
 Mihajlo Obrenović (1823–1868), Prince of Serbia (1839-1842) and (1860-1868)
 Mihajlo Petrović-Njegoš (1908–1986), Prince of Montenegro

Other
Mihajlo Klajn (1912–1941), Yugoslav Croatian agronomist and communist
Mihajlo Rostohar (1878–1966), Slovenian psychologist, author and educator
Mihajlo Kažić (born 1960), Serbian novelist
Mihajlo Svilojević, Serbian epic poetry hero
Mihajlo Mihajlovski, current chairman of RK Vardar Pro and MRK Vardar team handball clubs
Mihajlo Zurković (born 1978), Serbian pianist
Mihajlo Hranjac, Ragusan builder
Mihajlo Bata Paskaljević (1923–2004), Serbian actor

See also
 
Toponyms: Mihajlovo
Surnames: Mihajlović

Serbian masculine given names
Montenegrin masculine given names